The Hepburn Library of Colton, also known as the Colton-Hepburn Library, is a historic library building located at Colton, St. Lawrence County, New York.  It was designed by architect Ehrick Rossiter and built in 1912-1913  It is a one-story, cruciform plan, stone building with a hipped roof topped by a multi-staged wood cupola.  It sits on a raised basement and features an entrance portico with four unfluted Ionic order columns.  The building design reflects a combination of Arts and Crafts and Colonial Revival style architecture.  Funding for the library was provided by A. Barton Hepburn (1846-1922).

It was listed on the National Register of Historic Places in 2012.

References

Libraries on the National Register of Historic Places in New York (state)
Library buildings completed in 1908
Colonial Revival architecture in New York (state)
Buildings and structures in St. Lawrence County, New York
National Register of Historic Places in St. Lawrence County, New York
1908 establishments in New York (state)